Thimblemill Library is located in Smethwick, in the Metropolitan Borough of Sandwell. It was built in 1937 and designed by Smethwick Borough engineer Roland Fletcher and Chester Button, an architect.

It is built in brick in the Moderne style and was given Grade II listed building status in March 2003, legally protecting it from unauthorised alteration or demolition. The English Heritage list entry describes the building as "Warley Branch Library, Smethwick".

The building, at the junction of Beakes Road and Thimblemill Road, was renovated and extended in 2008. It offers a modern range of digital services and community space.

It is named after a nearby former watermill called the Thimble Mill.

References

Libraries in the West Midlands (county)
Grade II listed library buildings
Cultural infrastructure completed in 1937
Buildings and structures in Sandwell
Smethwick